A fairy tale is a story featuring folkloric characters.

Fairy Tale(s), Faerie Tale(s), Faery Tale(s),or Fairytale(s) may also refer to:

Films 
 Fairytale (film), a 2022 experimental film
 Fairy Tales (film), a 1978 sex comedy
 FairyTale: A True Story, a 1997 film based on the story of the Cottingley Fairies

Games 
 Fairy Tale (game), a card game
 A Fairy Tale (video game), a 2009 puzzle video game created by Reflexive Entertainment
 The Faery Tale Adventure, a 1987 adventure video game

Literature 
 Faerie Tale, a 1988 fantasy novel by Raymond E. Feist
 Fairy Tales (Cummings book), a book of fairy tales by e.e. cummings
 Fairy Tales (Jones book), a book of children's stories by Terry Jones
 Fairy Tale (novel), a 2022 novel by Stephen King
 Fairytale fantasy, a subgenre of fantasy that uses of folklore motifs and plots
 Several collections of fairy tales with distinguished illustrations by John Dickson Batten, published by Joseph Jacobs

Music
 Fairy Tale (Suk), an orchestral suite by Josef Suk

Albums
 Fairy Tale (Mai Kuraki album), or the title song
 Fairy Tale (Michael Wong album), or the title song
 Fairy Tales (Divine album), 1998
 Fairy Tales (Mother Gong album), 1979
 Fairy Tales, a 2014 album by Futurecop!
 Fairytale (album), a 1965 album by Donovan
 Fairytales (Alexander Rybak album), or the title song (see below)
 Fairytales (Desirée Sparre-Enger album), or the title song

Songs
 "Fairy Tale", by Shaman from Ritual
"Fairy Tale", by Loona 1/3 from Love & Live
 "Fairy Tales" (Anita Baker song), 1991
 "Fairytale" (Kalafina song)
 "Fairytale" (Pointer Sisters song), 1974
 "Fairytale" (Alexander Rybak song), the winning entry of the Eurovision Song Contest 2009
 "Fairytale" (Eneda Tarifa song), the Albanian entry for the Eurovision Song Contest 2016
 "Fairytale", by Sonata Arctica from The Ninth Hour
 "Fairytale", by Sara Bareilles from Careful Confessions and Little Voice
 "Fairytale", a 1976 single by Dana
 "Fairytale", by Edguy from Vain Glory Opera, 1998
 "Fairytale", by Enya from Enya
 "Fairytale", by Heavenly from Coming from the Sky
 "Fairytale", by Justin Bieber featuring Jaden Smith from Believe, 2012
 "Fairytales" (2 Brothers on the 4th Floor song), 1996

Television
 Fairy Tale (TV series), a Canadian LGBT dating show
 Fairy Tales (TV series), a 2008 British drama anthology series
 "Fairy Tale", the 12th episode in season 2 of the Disney Channel sitcom Wizards of Waverly Place
 "Fairytale" (The Crown), an episode of The Crown
 JJ Villard's Fairy Tales, an adult animated television series

Other uses
 A Fairy Tale (ballet), a ballet by Marius Petipa and Richter
 Fairy Tale (color), a shade of pink

See also
Fairy godmother (disambiguation)
 Fairy Tail, a 2006 manga by Hiro Mashima
Tooth Fairy (disambiguation)